Graeme Scott Alexander Forbes (born 29 July 1958) is a Scottish former footballer who played in the Football League for Walsall. He also made over 200 appearances for Motherwell.

References

1958 births
Living people
Scottish footballers
Association football defenders
English Football League players
People from Forfar
Lochee United F.C. players
Motherwell F.C. players
Walsall F.C. players
Dundee F.C. players
Montrose F.C. players
Scottish Professional Football League players
Footballers from Angus, Scotland